Ron Sim Chye Hock  (born 1958) is a Singaporean business magnate and investor. He is the founder of Osim International. In 2013, he ranked twenty-first on Forbes 2013 list of the fifty richest Singaporeans, with an estimated net worth of US$1.4billion.

Early life
Ron Sim Chye Hock was born in 1958 in Singapore. As a child, he sold noodles for a living.

Business career
Sim established the electrical and household appliance company Osim International in 1979. After close to a decade, Osim branched out its operations into Hong Kong, and subsequently the Republic of China. Apart from Osim, Sim also owns the China-based Richlife, GNC in Southeast Asia, and the United States-based Brookstone. In 2012, he was listed as thirty-third on Forbes''' "Singapore's 50 Richest" list. The following year, he rose to twenty-first. His estimated net worth increased to a billion dollars, mostly due to Osim's shares rapidly soaring.

Other ventures and recognition
Sim is an advisory board member of the Lee Kong Chian School of Business in Singapore. Among others, he has also been a Committee member of the Nanyang Technological University Enterprise Committee, a board member of both International Enterprise Singapore and Sentosa Development Corporation, and a trustee board member of the Tan Tock Seng Hospital Community Charity Fund. In 2004, Sim was the recipient of the "Entrepreneur of The Year" award by Ernst & Young. The same year, The Business Times'' presented him its "Businessman of the Year" award.

Personal life
Sim is married with three children. and resides in Singapore.

References

Singaporean people of Hokkien descent
1958 births
Singaporean billionaires
Living people